Garima Sanjay (born on 15 January, at Allahabad) is an author of novels and short stories, as well as a script writer and documentary film producer. She has been working in the Indian media industry for over two decades. She has written numerous books on various topics. She has even made various documentary and short films for both government agencies and for private companies. She is a curator and content developer for museums too. Among many museums in her credit, she has also worked for the Pradhanmantri Sangrahalaya, New Delhi, which was launched by the Prime Minister of India, Shri Narendra Modi on 14 April 2022.

Early life and education
Born in Allahabad (Uttar Pradesh), she did her schooling from St. Anthony's Convent Girls' Intermediate College. She did her graduation from Allahabad University in Economics and Post Graduation in Ancient History and Culture.

Career
After completing her Post Graduation in mass media studies from Indian Institute Of Mass Communication, she joined the media industry. Her professional career in the field of writing started more than twenty years back in New Delhi.

Her most notable works are Hindi novels 'Smritiyan' (2013), 'Aatank Ke Saaye Mein' (2015) and 'Khatte Mithe Se Rishte' (2019).

She has been regularly contributing on social and environmental issues in various magazines, newspapers and news-portals.

Her short stories have been published in magazines like Jagran Sakhi, Sahitya Amrit, Laghukatha.com, Dharohar, Yuva Pravartak etc. & features in Dainik Jagaran, Punjab Kesari, Rashtriya Sahara, SirfNews.com etc.

She regularly writes her blog at garimasanjay.com "Antardhwani – अंतर्ध्वनि"

She's contributed in providing Hindi content for four new museums sanctioned by the Government of India. Three museums for the Ministry of Culture "Yaaden Jalliyan" and "Shraddhanjali" established at Red Fort, Delhi and "Icons of Nationalism" at National Library, Kolkata and one for the Ministry of Textiles. The museums at Red Fort were inaugurated by PM Sri Narendra Modi on the birth anniversary of Netaji Subhash Chandra Bose, on 23 January 2019.

In documentary film making her highly appreciated works are "GLOF" (Glacial Lake Outburst Flood) for UNDP, "Madan Lal Dhingra" for Films Division of India and "Bhartiya Police- Saahas Yeh Bhi" for BPR&D under the guidance of Dr Kiran Bedi.

Literary works

Novels 

Smritiyaan (2013)
 Atank Ke Saaye Mein (2015)
 Khatte Meethe Se Rishtey (2019)
 Khwahishen Apni-APni (2020)

General books 

 Start up India- Shuru Karein Apna Karobar (2016)
 Constitution of India (A textbook on Indian Polity)
 Acupressure (Hindi & English)
 Aroma Therapy
 "1001 Tips for Good Health"
 Miniature book series on 12- Zodiac signs 
 Family Homeopathy Handbook

Translation 

 PM Narendra Modi : The Game Changer
 'My Father Sarat Chandra Bose' by Sisir Chandra Bose
 '"Reflections of a Surgeon" by Dr. V. N. Srikhande
 CSAT book, Computer text books and other text books for Tata McGraw Hills
 Hindi content for various educational software for Multivarsity, Pune
 Science and Social Sciences text books for NCERT
 'India Educator' a house journal of Discovery Channel
 ‘EXPORT MANAGEMENT’, a text book of IIFT, by Prof.B. Bhattacharya
 Various books on Alternative Therapies, viz. Juice & Fruit therapies, Reiki, Aroma Therapy, an encyclopedia of Acupressure, etc.

References

External links
  WorldCat Identities
Press Information Bureau 
Vice President @MVenkaiahNaidu receives a Book titled "Khatte Meethe Se Risthe" authored by Smt. Garima Sanjay, in New Delhipic.twitter.com/WS43XurFcc
[https://twitter.com/VPSecretariat/status/1150994893503774720 आज सुप्रतिष्ठित लेखिका, पटकथा लेखक और ब्लागर श्रीमती गरिमा संजय जी की कृति " खट्टे मीठे से रिश्ते" की प्रति साभार स्वीकार की। 
@GarimaSanjaypic.twitter.com/qeqkdvFzIW]
Delighted to have received the book 'Khatte Meethe se rishte' fromn the author Smt. Garima  Sanjay, an accomplished author, scriptwriter and blogger. @GarimaSanjaypic.twitter.com/NOjvfnCcu7
UNITED NEWS OF INDIA
Prabhat Khabar RANCHI – City epaper dated Wed, 17 Jul 19
 Smritiyaan – Vice President Releases Book "Smritiyan" by Garima Sanjay
 The Vice President, Shri Mohd. Hamid Ansari releasing the book
 Vice President Released a Book titled Smritiyan authored by Garima Sanjay
 Aatank Ke Saye Mein – VICE PRESIDENT RELEASES THE BOOK ‘AATANK KE SAAYE MEN’ BY GARIMA SANJA
 The Vice President, Shri Mohd. Hamid Ansari releasing a book entitled
 Start Up India – Shuru Karen Apna Karobaar – The Minister of State for Culture and Tourism (Independent Charge), Dr. Mahesh Sharma being presented a set of books titled ‘Start Up India’, ‘Smritiyan’ and ‘Aatank Ke Saaye Mein’, by the Author Ms. Garima Sanjay, in New Delhi on 12 September 2016.
 मेहंदी
 काली बिल्ली की व्यथा
Press Information Bureau 
Press Information Bureau
Antardhwani-अंतर्ध्वनि Antardhwani – अंतर्ध्वनि – Garima Sanjay

Women writers from Uttar Pradesh
1969 births
Living people
Hindi-language writers
Writers from Allahabad
20th-century Indian women writers
20th-century Indian writers